Oksibil Airport  is an airport located at Oksibil, Highland Papua, Indonesia. The runway can handle Turboprop STOL aircraft but is able to handle larger Turboprop Regional airliner. There are few buildings that acts as a terminal structure as well as a small tower in the tarmac area beside the runway.

Airlines and destinations

Incidents

On August 2nd, 2009, Merpati Nusantara Airlines Flight 9760 crashed on approach to the airport. 

On 16 August 2015 Trigana Air Flight 267 crashed on the mountain side en route to the airstrip killing all 54 on board.

In August 2018, another plane crash occurred, when a Pilatus PC-6 Porter traveling from Tanah Merah crashed shortly before it was due to land in Oksibil. It was carrying nine people, including two crew members, and one passenger survived.

References

Airports in Highland Papua